Ventongimps is a hamlet in mid Cornwall, England, United Kingdom. Ventongimps Moor nature reserve is located to the south of the hamlet.

References

External links
 BBC Domesday Project - Ventongimps

Hamlets in Cornwall